Manadhoo (Dhivehi: މަނަދޫ) is the capital of Noonu Atoll in the Maldives. Manadhoo is the third most populous island and the largest natural island in Noonu Atoll.

History
So far, the history of Manadhoo has not been studied by any authority despite having a historic place known as "Maamiskithu Vevu" a bathing tank with ancient Arabic calligraphy and well-bricked walls. Vevu (Dhivehi) or bathing tanks, were used as public baths and later for ablution. The actual period of this Vevu is unknown, however sandstone used in construction is evidence pointing to the pre-Islamic period (500BCE-1153AD).These types of baths are found in other parts of Maldives. Coral stone is also seen in some of the baths and mosques. This supports the theory that the Vevu was built earlier than most coral stone mosques.

Little information is available on the ancient people and their way of life. Evidence suggests that Manadhoo has been populated and thriving as early as the 4th-century BC. It is argued that the earliest settlers migrated from Arabia, eastern Africa and the Indian subcontinent among other places.

Geography

Geographically, Manadhoo is situated in the very centre of the atoll equally reachable for rest of other inhabited island to the north and south-west of the atoll. The island is at the south-east of the atoll, according to the formation of the atoll. The major available land is uninhabited.

Governance
The island is the capital of South Miladhunmadulu (Noonu Atoll), and most of the government offices have been established.

The Secretariat of the South Miladhummadulu Atoll Council
Manadhoo Police Station
Secretariat of the Manadhoo Council
Noonu Manadhoo Magistrate court
Noonu Atoll School
Noonu Atoll Hospital
Noonu Atoll Family and Children Service Centre
Maldives Inland Revenue Authority (MIRA) - Manadhoo Branch
Prosecutor General's Office - Miladhunmadulu Dhekunuburi Branch
FENAKA Corporation - Manadhoo Branch
Maldives Post - Noonu Manadhoo Branch
Bank of Maldives - Manadhoo Branch
Agro National Corporation - N Atoll Branch
Business Centre Corporation - N Atoll Branch

The President of Manadhoo council is Mr. Abdurrahman Sobeeh.

Demography
Manaduans are a mixed race, as in any part of the Maldives.

Economy
The main livelihood of the population depends on construction carpentry work civil service, tourism, fishing and private business.

The island has become a hub for the atoll ferry service, and wholesale business. Hence, respective citizens from other islands travel for medical and banking service, while retailers acquire their day-to-day supplies at the same rates as in the capital city.

Most of the basic infrastructure was built through aid granted from overseas organizations, such as the recent upgrade to the harbour which was funded by French aid. The sewerage and sanitation systems were built through aid granted from the UN. Manadhoo has the atoll school, which was built with grant aid from Japanese government during the 1980s.

Manadhoo is in close proximity to luxury hotels, which have been built recently, such as Soneva Jani and Cheval Blanc Randheli (operated by Louis Vuitton and Moët Hennessy), now owned by Sheik Mansour from Abu Dhabi.

The economy of Manadhoo is unhealthy like other islands of Maldives, hence no large-scale economic activities take place. Most of the citizens were engaged in public sector employment, with the rest employed in the tourism sector.

There has been a plan to develop tourist guest houses on the island, knowing that Maafaru Airport would begin operation in 2018 (funded by investment from the UAE). This could be a vital turning point for Manadhoo, hence the island is capable of leasing large amount of land to the beach front facing towards sunset.

Other services
Atoll Development Council Guest House, Bank of Maldives Manadhoo Branch, Noonu Atoll Family and Children Service Center and Noonu Manadhoo Post contributes to the infrastructure of the island.

Transportation
There are several Passenger and Cargo, Boats/Speed Boats operating between Manadhoo and the capital Male'; it takes about nine hours on the sea in order to reach the destination. However it only takes about 3 hours from Manadhoo to Male' by Speed Boats. Also there is the option of Air Transport, from Maafaru International Airport. Maafaru is just 5 minutes away from Manadhoo, if by Speed Boats.

Boats
Manzil Boat (Noonu Milandhoo)
Landhoo Boat (Noonu Landhoo)
Maafaru Boat (Noonu Maafaru)

Speed Boats and Ferry Services
Hope Travels HITHA
Hope Travels DHOSHA
Anax Express
Apple Express
Ell Prince
Ell Queen
Ell Speed
Ell Speed 3
Red Star

Education 
Noonu Atoll School is located on the island. Traditionally, education in the Manadhoo was limited to the basic literacy skills; namely the recital of the Quran, reading and writing the Dhivehi language. The modern system of English medium education was introduced in 1997.

Health 
Noonu Atoll Hospital, the STO Pharmacy and Maldivian Redcrescent Noonu Branch Office.

The island has severely poor achievements in human population.

Culture

Language
Dhivehi is the language spoken in Manadhoo. Spoken only in Maldives, Dhivehi belongs to the Indo-Aryan branch of the Indo-European family of languages. It has numerous loanwords from Tamil, Malayalam, Sinhalese, Arabic, Urdu, Hindi, Portuguese and English.

Religion
Islam is the official religion of the Republic of Maldives.

Non-profit Organizations and Sports Teams of Manadhoo

Like all other communities, Manadhoo also has Ngo's that works for the betterment of Manadhoo. Currently there are only 7 Ngo's actively working in Manadhoo.

NGO
Manadhoo Ekuveri Club (MEC)
Manadhoo Vilares Club (MVC)
Manadhoo Zuvaanunge Gulhun (MZG)
SMART Society (SMART)
Society for Manadhoo Youth Linkage (SMYL)
Society for Youth Recreating Union of Patriots (SYRUP)
Chester Sports (Chester)

Sports Teams
Baburu SC
Kanmathi Juniors
Damcaster United
Butani FC
JT SPORTS CLUB
Furious FC
FC Cicada
Prides FT
Wasted FC

References

External links
 http://www.manadhoolive.com
 https://husnoonu.com

Populated places in the Maldives
Islands of the Maldives